The Commander-in-Chief of the Royal Thai Air Force, currently Air Chief Marshal Alongkorn Wannarot, who is headquartered in Bangkok.

The following individuals have commanded the Royal Thai Air Force:

Royal Aeronautical Service

Royal Thai Air Force

See also
Royal Thai Air Force
Head of the Royal Thai Armed Forces
Chief of Defence Forces (Thailand)
List of commanders-in-chief of the Royal Thai Army
List of commanders-in-chief of the Royal Thai Navy

References

External links
 Website of the Royal Thai Air Force (in Thai)

Royal Thai Air Force personnel
Air Force Commanders